Alexander Pointner (born January 1, 1971 in Grieskirchen, Oberösterreich) is the former head coach of Austria ski jumping team.

Since 2014 he has been superseded by Heinz Kuttin as head coach of the Austrian National Skijumping Team.

References 

1971 births
Living people
Austrian ski jumping coaches
Austrian sports coaches
Universiade medalists in ski jumping
Universiade silver medalists for Austria
Competitors at the 1997 Winter Universiade